The Prince of Chernigov was the kniaz, the ruler or sub-ruler, of the Rus' Principality of Chernigov, a lordship which lasted four centuries straddling what are now parts of Ukraine, Belarus and the Russian Federation.

List of Princes of Chernigov

 Mstislav I the Bold, 1024–1036
 Sviatoslav I, 1054–1073
 Vsevolod I, 1073–1076
 Vladimir I Monomakh, 1076–1077
 Boris, 1077
 Vsevolod I (again), 1077–1078
 Oleg I, 1078
 Vladimir I Monomakh (again), 1078–1094
 Oleg I, 1094–1097
 Davyd Sviatoslavich, 1097–1123
 Yaroslav Sviatoslavich, 1123–1127
 Vsevolod II, 1127–1139
 Vladimir II Davydovich, 1139–1151
 Iziaslav I, 1151–1154
 Sviatoslav II Olgovich, 1157–1164
 Oleg II Sviatoslavich, 1164
 Sviatoslav III of Kiev, 1164–1177
 Yaroslav II Vsevolodovich (1176–1198)
 Igor Sviatoslavich the Brave (1198–1201/1202)
 Oleg III Sviatoslavich (1201/1202–1204)
 Vsevolod III Svyatoslavich (1204–1206/1208)
 Gleb I Sviatoslavich (1206/1208–1215/1220)
 Mstislav II Svyatoslavich (1215/1220–1223)
 Saint Mikhail I Vsevolodovich (1223–1235) (for the first time)
 Mstislav III Glebovich (1235–1239/1241)
 Rostislav I Mikhailovich (1241–1242)
 Saint Mikhail I Vsevolodovich (1242–1246) (for the second time)
 Roman I Mikhailovich the Old (1246/1247 – after 1288)
 Oleg IV Romanovich, 13th century
 Mikhail II, late 13th – early 14th century
 Mikhail III Aleksandrovich, 14th century
 Roman II Mikhailovich (the younger), died 1370
 "Dmitry" Kaributas Algirdaitis (Koribut or Korybut), c. 1372–1393
 Roman II Mikhailovich (the younger), restored, 1393–1401
 Absorbed by the Lithuanians, c. 1401

See also
 Prince of Novgorod-Seversk
 Prince of Briansk

References

Sources

External links
 

Noble titles of Kievan Rus
Princes of Chernigov